Richard Savitt (March 4, 1927 – January 6, 2023) was an American tennis player.

In 1951, at the age of 24, he won both the Australian and Wimbledon men's singles championships. Savitt was mostly ranked world No. 2 the same year behind fellow amateur Frank Sedgman, though was declared world No. 1 by The New York Times following his Wimbledon victory. He retired the following year to concentrate on a career in business. Savitt is one of four American men who have won both the Australian and British Championships in one year, following Don Budge (1938) and preceding Jimmy Connors (1974) and Pete Sampras (1994 and 1997). 
He won gold medals in both singles and men's doubles at the 1961 Maccabiah Games in Israel.

Savitt is enshrined in the International Tennis Hall of Fame, the Intercollegiate Tennis Association Men's Collegiate Tennis Hall of Fame, the USTA Eastern Tennis Hall of Fame, the International Jewish Sports Hall of Fame, and the National Jewish Sports Hall of Fame.

Early life
Savitt was born in Bayonne, New Jersey.  He taught himself tennis at the age of 14, but never took a tennis lesson in his life.  The self-taught Savitt played tennis well enough, however, to make the finals of the New Jersey Boys Championship and, for two years afterward, the National Boys Tennis Tournament before moving up to the junior ranks. He and his family moved to El Paso, Texas, in 1944, as his mother had a bad skin condition and needed the warmer weather.

His first love was basketball, though, and when his family moved to Texas, he was an All-State forward and a co-captain of El Paso High School, his El Paso, Texas high school basketball team in 1944.  Despite considering tennis his "second" sport after basketball, he won the Texas University Interscholastic League boys singles championship in 1944–45.  Nationally he was the 8th-ranked junior tennis player, and the 17th-ranked amateur overall.

In 1945 Savitt entered the Navy, was stationed at the Naval Air Station in Memphis, Tennessee, and played on a service basketball team.

College
Beginning in 1946, Savitt attended Cornell University, where he majored in economics, was a member of the Pi Lambda Phi fraternity, and was elected a member of the Sphinx Head Society.  However, two injuries, one to his knee, curtailed his basketball career.

Savitt resumed playing tennis.  He became Cornell's tennis team captain, # 1 singles and doubles player.  In 1947 he was ranked # 26 in the U.S., and two years later he was ranked # 17.  In both 1949 and 1950, as a junior and a senior, he won the Eastern Intercollegiate Tournament, and he won the doubles title with Leonard Steiner from 1948 to 1950.  In 1950 he also won the Eastern Clay Court Tournament and the New York State Tournament.  He was 57–2 in singles for his college career, and graduated in June 1950.

Post-college tennis career
Savitt ranked in the world's top 10 four times between 1951 and 1957 (# 2 in 1951); and in the U.S. top 10 six times between 1950 and 1959.  That was despite the fact that Savitt did not compete in 1953–55.  Among Savitt's major victories were the 1951 Wimbledon singles championship and the 1951 Australian Open. He also won the 1952, 1958, and 1961 USLTA National Indoor Championships, becoming the first player to win that crown three times, and won the Italian doubles. He won the Canadian singles and doubles championships.

1950–1953
Without any coaching, in 1950 Savitt reached the U. S. Tennis Championship semifinals at Forest Hills, losing to Art Larsen. In 1951, at the age of 24, Savitt won the Wimbledon Singles Championship. Along the way he beat Larsen, the # 1 U.S. player, in straight sets, and Herbert Flam, the # 2 U.S. player. He also won the Australian Open Singles title, winning in straight sets in the 61-minute final.  He became the first American since Don Budge, 13 years earlier, to win both Wimbledon and the Australian Open in one season.

Savitt also became the first Jewish player to win either tournament.  In the Jewish parts of North London, Savitt recalled, "Nobody knew tennis there, but after I won people started picking up rackets".  In addition, he became the first Jewish athlete to appear on the cover of Time magazine.  The significance of a Jewish tennis player succeeding was rooted in the fact that tennis was still at the time primarily a country club sport, and many country clubs often did not allow Jews in as members and did not allow them to use their courts.  This, in turn, kept many Jewish tennis players from obtaining the training they needed to compete at the highest levels.

Savitt was ranked 2nd in the world in 1951.  He was also ranked the # 1 player on the United States Davis Cup Team. He made it to the semifinals of the Australian Open in January 1952.  In February 1952 he beat Bill Talbert to win the U.S. National Indoor championship.  He won the Canadian singles and doubles championships in 1952, defeating Kurt Nielsen in the singles final in three straight sets. In September 1952, he beat Art Larsen to win the Pacific Coast men's singles tennis championship.

Davis Cup snub, and retirement

Savitt had played and won his three early 1951 Cup matches, winning 9 of 10 sets as the American team beat Australia.  Allison Danzig, the senior American tennis writer, called him America's best hope for victory. He had also defeated Australia's best other player, Frank Sedgman, in the same tournament.  Ted Schroeder, who had lost all three of his Davis Cup matches while losing 9 out of 10 sets in the process the year before and who was in semi-retirement, was chosen by non-playing captain Frank Shields instead.  Five of the top ten players in the U.S. publicly accused Shields of "obvious prejudice" in his choosing the team. Without Savitt playing singles, and with Schroeder losing two of his three matches, the United States lost the 1951 Davis Cup to Australia.

The controversy spilled over into the next year, when the 1951 nationally ranked players were bitterly debated at the January 1952 U.S. Lawn Tennis Association annual meeting.  Members of the Association's Eastern, New England, Southern, Florida, and Texas delegations, whose chief spokesman was Gardnar Mulloy, were in favor of Savitt being named the No. 1 tennis player in the U.S. However, Frank Shields attacked Savitt in a "biting", "unprecedented" speech, which observers said swung the vote against Savitt. As it was reported by Time magazine, "the loudest talker was Frank Shields, non-playing captain of the losing U.S. Davis Cup team. Shields had ignored Savitt in the Davis Cup matches, had put his confidence in aging (30) Ted Schroeder ... who turned out to be the goat of the series. Shields was intent on keeping Savitt ranked ... at No. 3. Cried Shields:  'Never once in the past three months has Savitt looked like a champion.  Don McNeill, the 1940 U.S. champion, answered Shields' outburst by pointing out that players are ranked on their tennis ability, that personal prejudice should have nothing to do with ranking, and that Shields' remarks were "uncalled for".  That met with "resounding applause" from the delegates.  Australian Davis Cup team Harry Hopman called his arguments as to why Savitt should not be ranked # 1 "weak".  Still, a never-before-required proxy vote was needed to decide the # 1 spot. Savitt was ranked the No. 2 player in the U.S. by the U.S. Lawn Tennis Association, behind Vic Seixas and directly ahead of Tony Trabert. In February 1952, a distraught Savitt announced that he would play only one more tournament, the National Indoor Championships, and then retire from tournament tennis—at age 25. He later explained that there was insufficient money in the amateur game to support his needs, requiring him to pursue his business career. Savitt did not believe that anti-Semitism was the cause of his problems with Shields.  Savitt had beaten Shields badly in the quarterfinals of the New Jersey State Championships in 1948.

Post-retirement tennis career
Savitt returned to the competitive tennis scene part-time in 1956. In 1958, Savitt moved back to New York for business reasons and launched a part-time comeback in tennis. That year, he won his second National Indoors title, and in 1961 he captured his third—while remaining a weekend player. In 1981, he and his son, Robert, won the U.S. Father-Son doubles title.

Maccabiah Games; Israel
In 1961, he won gold medals in both singles (defeating American Mike Franks in the final), and doubles (with Franks, defeating South Africans Rod Mandelstam and Julie Mayers), at the 1961 Maccabiah Games in Israel, the third-largest sporting event in the world.  He was also very active in the Maccabi movement.

Savitt in addition helped develop the Israel Tennis Centers, beginning in 1973.  In 1998, he was the ITA overseas tennis director. In his 2007 book The Big Book of Jewish Sports Heroes: An Illustrated Compendium of Sports History and The 150 Greatest Jewish Sports Stars, author Peter S. Horvitz ranked Savitt the 9th-greatest Jewish athlete of all time.

Halls of fame
Savitt was inducted into the International Tennis Hall of Fame in 1976.  Savitt was also inducted into the International Jewish Sports Hall of Fame in 1979.  He was inducted into the Intercollegiate Tennis Association Men's Collegiate Tennis Hall of Fame in 1986.  Savitt was inducted into the National Jewish Sports Hall of Fame in 1998, and into the USTA Eastern Tennis Hall of Fame in 1999.

After tennis
Following his competitive tennis career, Savitt entered the oil business in Louisiana.  He then worked for Lehman Brothers on Wall Street, and in 1985 joined Schroders. Savitt died on January 6, 2023, at the age of 95.

Grand Slam finals

Singles (two titles)

Doubles (two runner-ups)

Grand Slam performance timeline

See also
 List of select Jewish tennis players

References

External links
 
 
 
 
 Hall of Fame Magazine bio
 American Jewish Historical Society bio
 Jews in Sports bio
 Jewish Virtual Library bio

1927 births
2023 deaths
American male tennis players
Australian Championships (tennis) champions
Cornell Big Red men's basketball players
Cornell Big Red men's tennis players
Jewish American sportspeople
Jewish tennis players
Maccabiah Games gold medalists for the United States
Sportspeople from Bayonne, New Jersey
People from El Paso, Texas
International Tennis Hall of Fame inductees
Tennis people from New Jersey
Tennis people from Texas
Maccabiah Games medalists in tennis
Wimbledon champions (pre-Open Era)
Grand Slam (tennis) champions in men's singles
Competitors at the 1961 Maccabiah Games
American men's basketball players
Forwards (basketball)
United States Navy personnel of World War II
Military personnel from New Jersey
Military personnel from Texas
21st-century American Jews